Skąpe  is a village in Świebodzin County, Lubusz Voivodeship, in western Poland. It is the seat of the gmina (administrative district) called Gmina Skąpe.

The village has a population of 421.

References

Villages in Świebodzin County